Banco Banespa (Banco do Estado de São Paulo) was a Brazilian regional bank, founded in 1909 by the state government of São Paulo. The bank was privatized in November 2000 by the government of former president Fernando Henrique Cardoso and sold to Spanish bank Santander.

References

Banks established in 1909
Banks disestablished in 2001
Defunct banks of Brazil